Albrecht Penck (25 September 1858 – 7 March 1945) was a German geographer and geologist and the father of Walther Penck.

Biography 
Born in Reudnitz near Leipzig, Penck became a university professor in Vienna, Austria, from 1885 to 1906, and in Berlin from 1906 to 1927. There he was also the director of the Institute and Museum for Oceanography by 1918. He dedicated himself to geomorphology and climatology, and he raised the international profile of the Vienna school of physical geography.

With Eduard Brückner, he coauthored Die Alpen im Eiszeitalter, a work in which the two scientists identified the four ice ages of the European Pleistocene (Gunz, Mindel, Riss, Würm); these being named after the river valleys that were the first indication of each glaciation.

In 1886, he married the sister of the successful Bavarian regional writer Ludwig Ganghofer. In 1945, Penck died in Prague.

In Vienna, he taught the Polish geographer Eugeniusz Romer and Ukrainian geographer Stepan Rudnytsky, who led the ethnographic efforts at the Paris Peace Conference (1919–1920).

Penck arranged for the posthumous publication of his son's work Der Morphologische Analyse in 1924. However he did not take any stance for or against his son's theories on geomorphology.

In 1928, Penck taught as a visiting professor at the University of California at Berkeley led by Carl O. Sauer.

Albrecht Penck was elected a member of the Royal Swedish Academy of Sciences in 1905 and awarded the Founder's Medal of the Royal Geographical Society in 1914.

Legacy
The glacier of Penckbreen in Wedel Jarlsberg Land at Spitsbergen, Svalbard is named after him. Since 1958 the "Albrecht-Penck-Medaille" is awarded by the  Deutsche Quartärvereinigung for accomplishments associated with Quaternary science.

In memory of Penck, the painter and sculptor Ralf Winkler adopted the nom de plume A. R. Penck in 1966.

Works
 Morphologie der Erdoberfläche; 2 vols, 1894 
 (with Eduard Bruckner) Die Alpen im Eiszeitalter; 3 vols, 1909
 Die Gipfelflur der Alpen (1919)
 With geographer Eduard Richter, he was editor of the Atlas der Österreichischen Alpenseen (Atlas of the Austrian Alpine Lakes, 1895).
 International Map of the World

Further reading
 Hanna Bremer: Albrecht Penck (1858–1945) and Walther Penck (1888–1923), two German Geomorphologists. In: Zeitschrift für Geomorphologie, Vol. 27, 1983, pp. 129–138.
 Richard J. Chorley, Robert P. Beckinsale & Antony J. Dunn: The History of the Study of Landforms or the Development of Geomorphology, Vol. 2., The Life and Work of William Morris Davis, London 1973.
 Nicolas Ginsburger: "La guerre, la plus terribles des érosions". Cultures de guerre et géographes universitaires. France, Allemagne, Etats-Unis (1914-1921)" [archive], unpublished PhD, Université de Paris-Ouest-Nanterre-La Défense, 2010, 1682 p.
 Nicolas Ginsburger: "Der Berliner Geograph Albrecht Penck im Ersten Weltkrieg: Die Mobilmachungen eines Akademikers (1914-1920)". In: Acta Historica Leopoldina,75, 2019, pp. 151–163.
 Michael Heffernan: Professor Penck's Bluff: Geography, Espionage and Hysteria in World War I. In: Scottish Geographical Journal, Vol. 116, no. 4, 2000, pp. 267–282. 
 Norman Henniges: "Sehen lernen": Die Exkursionen des Wiener Geographischen Instituts und die Formierung der Praxiskultur der geographischen (Feld-)Beobachtung in der Ära Albrecht Penck (1885-1906).] In: Mitteilungen der Österreichischen Geographischen Gesellschaft, Vol. 156, Wien 2014, pp. 141–170. (online)
 Norman Henniges: "Naturgesetze der Kultur“: Die Wiener Geographen und die Ursprünge der „Volks- und Kulturbodentheorie“. In:  ACME: An International E-Journal for Critical Geographies, Vol. 14, 4, 2015, pp. 1309–1351.
 Norman Henniges: Die Spur des Eises: eine praxeologische Studie über die wissenschaftlichen Anfänge des Geologen und Geographen Albrecht Penck (1858-1945). (= Beiträge zur regionalen Geographie. Vol. 69), Leibniz-Institut f. Länderkunde, Leipzig 2017, 556 p. (online)
 Norman Henniges: Albrecht Penck. In: Ingo Haar, Michael Fahlbusch (eds.): Handbuch der völkischen Wissenschaften, 2nd ed., Berlin 2017, pp. 570–577. 
 Alexander Pinwinkler: „Hier war die große Kulturgrenze, die die deutschen Soldaten nur zu deutlich fühlten …“ Albrecht Penck (1858–1945) und die deutsche „Volks- und Kulturbodenforschung“. In: Österreich in Geschichte und Literatur. Vol. 55, 2011, pp. 180–191.
 Ingo Schaefer: Der Weg Albrecht Pencks nach München, zur Geographie und zur alpinen Eiszeitforschung. In: Mitteilungen der Geographischen Gesellschaft in München. Vol 74, 1989, pp. 5–25.
 Hans-Dietrich Schultz: „Ein wachsendes Volk braucht Raum.“ Albrecht Penck als politischer Geograph. In: Bernhard Nitz, Hans-Dietrich Schultz, Marlies Schulz (eds.): 1810–2010: 200 Jahre Geographie in Berlin (= Berliner Geographische Arbeiten. Vol. 115). Berlin 2010, pp. 91–135. [2nd ed. 2011, pp. 99–153.]
 Hans-Dietrich Schultz: Albrecht Penck: Vorbereiter und Wegbereiter der NS-Lebensraumpolitik? In: E&G Quaternary Sci. J., Vol. 66, 2018, pp. 115–129.
 Steven Seegel: Map Men: Transnational Lives and Deaths of Geographers in the Making of East Central Europe, University of Chicago Press, Chicago 2018.

Citations

References

External links
 

1858 births
1945 deaths
German geographers
German geomorphologists
19th-century German geologists
German climatologists
Quaternary geologists
Members of the Royal Swedish Academy of Sciences
Foreign associates of the National Academy of Sciences
Recipients of the Pour le Mérite (civil class)
Academic staff of the Humboldt University of Berlin
Academic staff of the University of Vienna
Scientists from Leipzig